Waimea was a parliamentary electorate in the Nelson Province of New Zealand, from 1853 to 1887. Initially represented by two members, it was a single-member electorate from 1861.

Geographic coverage
Waimea was located in the northern part of the South Island, facing the Tasman Bay / Te Tai-o-Aorere. It is the area around the town (and since 1874 city) of Nelson, but excluded Nelson itself. It includes Wakefield, Brightwater, Richmond and smaller settlements north of Nelson. It was named after the Waimea River.

History
Waimea was represented by eleven Members of Parliament.

Four members were nominated for the inaugural : David Monro, William Cautley, Charles Elliott, and John Saxton. Whilst Elliott and Saxton subsequently withdrew, Monro and Cautley wanted to go ahead with the poll held on 16 August, as one had been demanded on behalf of the other candidates. There was confusion at the Waimea South polling booth and votes were cast for all four candidates there.

William Travers, MP for Nelson, and Cautley, MP for Waimea, both resigned on 26 May 1854 – the third day that the new Parliament was sitting. Travers subsequently contested the seat that Cautley had vacated, being elected in the 21 June 1854 Waimea by-election. Nomination day for the second Parliament in the Waimea electorate was Monday, 5 November 1855. Charles Elliott and Travers were the only candidates and were thus declared elected.

Alfred Saunders was elected on 1 February 1861 and resigned on 31 October 1864. He was succeeded by John George Miles, who was elected in the 1864 by-election, which was held on 20 November.

Arthur Robert Oliver was elected on 23 February 1866 and resigned on 9 January 1867. He was succeeded by Edward Baigent, who was elected in the 1867 by-election, which was held on 28 June.

Joseph Shephard was elected on 13 February 1871, and re-elected on 8 December 1979, 9 December 1881 and 22 July 1884. He resigned on 15 April 1885 when he was appointed to the Legislative Council. The resulting 1885 by-election, which was held on 3 June, was contested by six candidates: John Kerr (253 votes), W. N. Franklyn (250 votes), William White (94 votes), Christian Dencker (91 votes), W. Wastney (59 votes) and Jesse Piper (32 votes). Kerr was thus elected.

Members of Parliament
Key

multi-member electorate

Single-member electorate

Election results

1885 by-election

1867 by-election

1864 by-election

1854 by-election

1853 election

Notes

References

Historical electorates of New Zealand
Politics of the Marlborough Region
1853 establishments in New Zealand
1887 disestablishments in New Zealand
Politics of the Nelson Region